The National Labor Federation (NATLFED) is a network of local community associations, run exclusively by volunteers, that organizes workers excluded from collective bargaining protections by U.S. labor law, specifically under the National Labor Relations Act of 1935. Although the groups affiliated with NATLFED have denied any political affiliation, some former participants say NATLFED is a front for the Provisional Communist Party of the United States, which has, in the past, advocated the armed overthrow of the government. NATLFED consists of several dozen mutual benefit associations and organizers who canvass in working-class neighborhoods and coordinate assistance programs operated by members and volunteers of the associations. According to the groups' literature, these benefit programs provide members with basic emergency food, clothing, medical and dental care, legal advice, child care, and job referrals.

Press accounts of the groups affiliated with NATLFED sometimes praise their social work,<ref name=Bazar>Bazar, Emily.  "Migrant workers get refunds on rent charges" Sacramento Bee August 26, 2004</ref>Melendez, Linda.  WFWA 'here to win, here to stay'. The Prospector (Yuba Community College). 2003-11-24. sometimes raise concerns about their lack of transparency,Berliner, Uri.  "Labor Group: Saga of a Cult". East Hampton Star September 18, 1986. and sometimes condemn the organizations for exploitative treatment of volunteers.Russakoff, Joe.  "Doorway to a Cult?"  City Paper (Philadelphia, Pennsylvania) June 26 – July 3, 1987.

Practices and beliefs

Strata organizing
NATLFED pursues a course of organizing based on the view of current membership leadership, who form Councils, which contend that since few U.S. workers are still employed in large-scale factory operations, new methods are needed to go beyond historic membership organizing tactics issued from the factory gate.
Union workers are kept in separate bargaining units and not permitted to exercise time-honored methods of collective action based on community backing and mutual aid. As a result US workers labor for longer hours under more dangerous conditions for less pay and often without health and pension benefits. A new approach is needed.  NATLFED organizations direct their efforts toward "unrecognized workers in the United States [who are] so far excluded from the somewhat dubious benefits of the National Labor Relations Act." The Essential Organizer, a manuscript describing the techniques of "systemic organizing", purports to teach participants an approach for unrecognized workers to obtain benefits that are needed and are rightfully theirs in a manner consistent with their best overall interest. At the same time unrecognized workers can materially see the benefits of organization in general as well as how to build their own organizations in particular.The only thing that really makes sense is the local community-based associations that reach unrecognized workers and unite them with current and former union workers, retired workers, local business leaders, professionals and others who share a common concern for the long-term future of our communities.

A 10-year lawsuit brought by members of Western Farm Workers Association residing in state-run migrant camps against the California Office of Migrant Services resulted in a monetary victory for the group of workers who brought suit under the legal guidance and practical organizing participation of Coalition of Concerned Legal Professionals to recover illegal rent increases:
"Without organization, we could never have gotten money back," said claimant José Rodríguez, a WFWA member in Yuba County and former resident of the Davis Migrant Center in Yolo County. "The State would have taken advantage of us. This is a real victory for farm worker independent organizing efforts."

Recruitment
NATLFED recruits many of its members and volunteers from college campuses, through voluntary service programs, and by appeal to the larger community through speaking engagements and direct contact. For example, in one meeting of the American Sociological Association, Mark Levine, Western Service Workers Association, explained his view of the dynamics of government policy on social stratification:
[H]e re-directed his Ph.D.to service when he discovered U.S. economic policies were mirroring pre-WWII policies in Germany which replaced higher paid workers with lower-paid ones, scapegoating and punishing workers. Levine used extensive volunteer help to enable these workers as an organized voice for change at WSWA functions. They have combated the downward wage effects of enterprise zones, in a deficit-laden California slashing education, health care, child care, and disabled services.

Shari Beck, a retired school teacher, has been volunteering at WSWA for the past three years. "Everybody who helps out can make things better," Beck said. "I feel like I'm doing something for the community." Beck, who volunteers alongside her husband, believes that by volunteering at WSWA, she has become more aware of things going on in her community. "We wanted to spend time in the community," Beck said.

Goals and objectives
Carlotta Woolcock, an organizer for Northwest Seasonal Workers Association, described its goals as "to provide a voice for the poor and working people that is independent from the government and addresses the problems that go along with being poor." Literature printed by the organization asserts the principle that "every man, woman and child is entitled to adequate and appropriate food, clothing, shelter and medical care as basic human rights." Woolcock described the ultimate end of giving working people a voice to the Ashland Daily Tidings:
Our goal is to form a worker's plebiscite, giving the workers a real vote. What most people vote for is the lesser of two evils offered them. A real say is stating real needs and having the resources to meet them. There needs to be more of a voice for the working people.

History

Origins
NATLFED grew out of the Eastern Farm Workers Association (EFWA) in Suffolk County, New York, founded in 1972 by Gino Perente and others. Perente had worked at the New York office of the United Farm Workers Organizing Committee in 1971 or 1972 and, according to Dolores Huerta, "created a lot of problems for the union, attacking us in the press. Then he went off and formed his own group."

In 1972, Perente and his followers headed to migrant labor camps in rural Long Island, New York, from an office in Bellport, New York, to organize agricultural workers. The EFWA received press attention in its early days for attempting to organize farm workers at the I.M. Young company, a potato grower. Perente organized 800 farm workers with 30 full-time EFWA staff and 70 volunteers in December 1972, when the EFWA led a strike of potato workers. This was the first union of agricultural workers on the East Coast; nonetheless, the Department of Labor determined that EFWA was not a labor organization as defined by federal law.

The 1972 strike against I.M. Young remains a central part of the volunteer training process. There is little further information about the EFWA's early years.

Perente was by all accounts a charismatic personality. He inspired volunteers with revolutionary positions and established discipline among the organizing drive's volunteers. Later accounts identified him as Gerald William Doeden, a former disc jockey from California with a less than pure reputation.

Growth
In the mid-1970s, Perente removed himself from public view, but encouraged his followers to expand the scope of the initial organizing drives in Sacramento and Long Island. He established an office in Brooklyn to direct the growing network he called the National Labor Federation (NATLFED), and refined an elaborate system to train and ensure the loyalty of volunteers by founding the Provisional Communist Party, a secret society of his associates. Perente gave lectures offering idiosyncratic interpretations of the writings of Karl Marx, Vladimir Lenin, and Joseph Stalin to audiences at the NATLFED office.

Perente's movement used its core of volunteers to expand, sending recruiters to other cities and towns, starting about 20 mutual benefit associations and perhaps as many related support organizations by the late 1970s. The new organizing drives were built closely on the model of the EFWA, using its 1973 organizational handbook, The Essential Organizer. The entities are managed by full-time volunteers, called cadre, many of whom have dedicated their lives to the movement.

In 1973, the California Homemakers Association pressured Sacramento County and won wage increases for attendant care workers. Subsequently, the county agreed to bargain with CHA over the terms of individual contracts with its home care workers. CHA organizer David Shapiro hailed the agreement as "the first time that household workers have achieved the right to bargain".

NATLFED entities

NATLFED operates about 30 offices called "entities" around the U.S., concentrated in California and the Northeast. The Eastern Farm Workers Association (now in Bellport, New York and Syracuse, New York) and California Homemakers Association (in Sacramento, California) were founded in the early 1970s, and were followed by Eastern Service Workers Association, Western Service Workers Association, the Commemoration Committee for the Black Panther Party in Oakland, California, Western Massachusetts Labor Action in Pittsfield, Massachusetts, Western Farm Workers Association in Stockton, California, Yuba City, California, and Hillsboro, Oregon, Friends of Seasonal and Service Workers in Portland, Oregon and Northwest Seasonal Workers Association in Medford, Oregon.

Since Perente's death, several new entities have opened, including Midwest Workers Association in Chicago, Illinois, Alaska Workers Association in Anchorage, Alaska, and Mid-Ohio Workers Association in Columbus, Ohio.

Public scrutiny and controversy
NATLFED groups have kept a low profile, operating with little public attention for ten years, and journalists writing about the various groups have both praised and condemned the organizing drives.

In the early 1980s, several journalists wrote highly critical articles about several groups in the federation. One such article, written for the Christian Century magazine, described changes in the leadership of the Commission on Voluntary Service and Action (CVSA). Originally a church-affiliated nonprofit organization, the CVSA had since 1946 annually printed a catalog of volunteer opportunities called Invest Yourself: a Catalog of Volunteer Opportunities. A number of full-time NATLFED organizers had taken leadership positions on CVSA's board. In the early 1980s, when CVSA was struggling financially, NATLFED took responsibility and control of its operations, leaving some of the church leadership bitter. As many as 50 NATLFED entities were listed among about 200 service organizations in the catalog during the 1980s and 1990s. The number has slowly dropped since then; fewer than ten NATLFED entities were listed in the 2004 edition.

The political investigative magazine The Public Eye published two articles about NATLFED. The first, by Harvey Kahn in 1977, alleged an obscure but friendly relationship between Perente's NATLFED and Lyndon LaRouche's National Caucus of Labor Committees. Tourish and Wohlforth report a similarly tenuous but longer-lived alliance between NATLFED and Fred Newman's new International Workers Party in the mid-1970s. Perente became head of the IWP-organized Nationwide Unemployment League, and soon dissolved it.The Public Eye published a longer exposé by former volunteer Jeff Whitnack in 1984 in which Whitnack identified Perente as Doeden and interviewed some of Doeden's friends in California. Whitnack concluded that the whole operation was a scam punctuated with drama and hints of violence.

On February 17, 1984, the Federal Bureau of Investigation raided a law office and the NOC headquarters at 1107 Carroll Street in Crown Heights, Brooklyn, on tips that it "had planned a series of violent acts".Rosenfeld, Neil S. et al. "Group Raided By FBI Called Harmless Cult". Newsday. February 19, 1984. Kit Decious, Kathleen Paolo, and Daniel P. Foster, three lawyers among the organization's cadre, were convicted of felony larceny and possession of forged documents relating to the 1984 departure of Mia Prior, a member of ten years; they were disbarred in New York following their convictions in the 1980s. Paolo's conviction was overturned on appeal.

On November 11, 1996, the New York City Police Department raided the NOC again on an anonymous complaint that children were being abused in the office. The police seized 49 antique firearms and $42,000 in cash, and arrested 35 people.Jones, Charisse.  "Grand jury seeks reason behind a group's arsenal".  The New York Times. November 14, 1996. Newspapers around the country ran columns about the group. Two of the organizers, Susan Angus and Diane Garrett, were initially convicted of misdemeanor possession of weapons, but the appeals court overturned the convictions because the search was improperly conducted without a warrant. No evidence of child abuse was ever produced, and press coverage died down rapidly.

Shortly after the 1996 raid, an anonymously website appeared created by "an informal network of people" who were "frightened for the current members who are our children, siblings, former friends, and coworkers." The site condemned NATLFED and archived many news articles and other stories about it. The site disappeared from its original host in 2004 and is mirrored on the Wayback machine at http://users.rcn.com/xnatlfed/.

In 2016, Random House Canada published former cadre Sonja Larsen's memoir Red Star TattooMy Life as a Girl Revolutionary. The book details her time growing up in field offices and moving to the organization's Brooklyn headquarters as a teenager in the 1980s. Larsen writes about her relationship with Perente/Doeden and the emotional, physical and sexual abuse of women she witnessed while living at the safe house around the time of the organization's revolutionary "countdown".

Recent activities
Since Perente's death in 1995, and the raid on its headquarters in 1996, there has been little information about how NATLFED is run, though Margaret Ribar is reported to have assumed leadership.

The Eastern Service Workers Association (ESWA) operates on numerous college and university campuses in the Northeast, quietly recruiting student volunteers through the service-learning offices available to all students. The ESWA is thriving in Boston, Massachusetts, and Rochester, New York, with assistance from several local churches and businesses that may not be aware of the group's practices or connection to NATLFED.Benjamin, Cynthia.  "Dental care is luxury for many locals "  Rochester Democrat and Chronicle (Rochester, NY) October 2, 2004.

The Coalition of Concerned Legal Professionals filed a class-action lawsuit against the State of California on behalf of migrant farm workers who worked in state-run camps in 1996 and 1997. In 2004, they won the case. West-coast entities participated in demonstrations against physician-assisted suicide in 2005. In 2006, the Jackson County Fuel Committee petitioned the Ashland City Council to halt utility cutoffs and distributes 30-40 cords of firewood each year to people in Jackson county.

Operational patterns
It is difficult to get information about NATLFED and its entities because the organization is institutionally secretive. An internal memo quoted in the East Bay Express in 1984 gave the following instructions on withholding information from outsiders:  We regard outside inquiry from a position of distrust. ... Never ask to know more than you need to know if you agree with the goals and strategy of the group. It's unfair to burden a comrade with unneeded information, and also unprofessional. The standard answer to any question you have not been instructed to answer is "It's not my department."
At times entity operations managers have been directed not to give interviews to reporters; other times managers insisted that reporters volunteer with the organization to get a story on it; other times volunteers gave reporters a runaround.

Most NATLFED entities produce regular newspapers to inform supporters and volunteers, and to generate revenue from advertising. The Women's Press Collective, for example, prints the magazine Collective Endeavor about media reform and topics concerning women, and the CCLP and CCMP each publish the quarterly newsletters, The Gavel and The Verdict.

Mutual benefit associations
Recruiters from the cadre start new entities armed with lists of contacts. The recruiters approach community and business leaders with their mission statement and ask for help with founding the entity. An organizing committee is created that includes community leaders willing to at least lend their names to the new effort, and the recruiters solicit donated office space until they can purchase an office.

The entities establish a program that provides services to members free of charge and soon start door-to-door campaigns to recruit volunteers and recruit low-income workers. Available resources and the scope of the program vary, but usually include food, clothing, and holiday events for children. Some entities provide more involved services for members, such as medical, legal, and dental services for volunteers and low-income members. Critics of the organizations contend that the 11-point benefit program promises far more than the entities can deliver. Supporters use criticisms of the paucity of resources to motivate volunteers to take action to expand these resources.

Critics and supporters of the organizations agree that the cadre consumes some of the food, clothing and other goods collected for the poor. Critics and some former members have claimed that the entities are highly inefficient—that the cadre consumes much of the cash, food and clothing they purport to collect for the poor.

Volunteers for the entities canvass poor residential areas to recruit low-income members, knocking on doors and delivering a pitch that includes a brief explanation of organization, promises benefits, and asks for participation. Poor members are asked to contribute $0.62 per month as membership dues, an amount said to be the average hourly pay for workers at I. M. Young in 1972. New members also sign an authorization form giving the association vague authority to bargain on the member's behalf. The groups also solicit resources (funds, food, clothing, medical services and legal aid) from professionals, business owners, and volunteers willing to contribute to the cause.

Cadre recruitment
Perhaps NATLFED entities' most noticeable feature is their aggressive recruitment of new cadre from the ranks of volunteers who participate. NATLFED entities send speakers to churches, residential neighborhoods, shopping centers, university campuses, music festivals, and other venues introducing themselves and soliciting volunteers and resources. At these events, organizers read a brief introduction to the organization to new volunteers and try to schedule visits to their office and participation in volunteer-run activities.

For recruitment purposes, NATLFED entities keep extensive records of all their contacts on index cards. Drawers of these cards contain detailed information about any sort of contact the group has with volunteers, members, donors, and other supporters. Whitnack has claimed that this elaborate paperwork is unnecessary, inefficient, and intended to exhaust the volunteers, in order to keep them in a suggestible state.

NATLFED also has an elaborate system for persuading volunteers to further the organization's goals by assuming roles of authority themselves, and the social pressure they apply convinces some volunteers to de-emphasize goals of their own. Regular volunteers are periodically interviewed and asked to increase their commitment to the organization.

Former members claim that deception and psychological manipulation mix with the sensation some new recruits experience of an intellectual awakening as stories of past labor struggles explain the underside of U.S. history, and classes in dialectical materialism provide a coherent, if stilted, worldview. NATLFED converts' commitment is solidified by the emotional impact of working to exhaustion surrounded by others who constantly reinforce the group's message and beliefs.

Critics deride NATLFED's focus on the indigent, claiming that it is merely cover for more sinister activity. Jeff Whitnack told The Boston Globe, "They are like political Moonies. They use poor people as flypaper to attract members."

Cult accusations
NATLFED and its entities are often labeled a cult, are listed on cult watch websites, and have been described as a cult by various journalists.""Charitable Front," Matthew Smith, SF Weekly, Dec. 9, 2009 NATLFED supporters and organizers contest the label as loaded and misleading.

In his 1984 Public Eye article, Whitnack argues that the cadre's narrow and paranoid ideology, the long working hours that sever volunteers' connections to the outside world, and the deliberate schedule of mind-numbing work are all features of a cult.

In Red Star Tattoo-My Life as a Girl Revolutionary'', Larsen also calls the organization cultlike. "The sense of urgency. The time table. The secret language. The mythical elements. The sexual control. The lack of sleep. The control, internal and external, over thought and movement. The denial of self. There was a checklist, and I made a mark by nearly every line."

Governance and financial questions
In their publications, the individual entities and affiliate organizations, such as CCLP, describe themselves as independent, locally chartered membership associations. The organizations claim to accept only private donations that come "with no strings attached", and claim to be answerable only to their organizing committee and to their membership.
CCLP is not subject to the whims of constantly changing Congressional and Presidential administrations. Because CCLP does not receive federal funds, it can organize without being subject to arbitrary restrictions on representation, audits of client files, unpredictable fluctuations in income, and general harassment from LSC and OIG bureaucrats, all of which are the plight of an LSC-funded attorney in the 21st century. Unfortunately, the over 30-year history of the LSC shows that these conditions are likely to continue for the foreseable future. CCLP does not focus merely on individual representation or the issue-oriented litigation which others rely on to gain backing.

The individual organizations are not themselves labor unions. The various entities identify themselves with the labor movement for the purpose of attracting volunteers and supporters, but when describing their organization make clear that they do not advocate the formation of trade unions per se, calling themselves "labor organizations of a new type".

Conclusions differ
The NATLFED network's various organizations have nearly identical rhetoric and training procedures, though they are spread out in many cities. Many of their donors and supporters speak up in defense of the services they provide for their communities. Former NATLFED cadre Robin Spellman-Fahlberg, who was an operations manager with Upstate NY EFWA for a decade, said in 2004 that in addition to helping in the most disenfranchised communities,
There is also a hidden, for want of a better description, evil, side of NATLFED. When I was there, and from what I've heard continues to be the case, there were manipulative people in powerful positions. Full-timers were subjected to an increasingly severe mental abuse and subjugation. ... They felt the only way to help poor people was through Natlfed, that there was no possible success for them after leaving, and/or they were subject to physical threats if they did.
Other entity operations personnel share an entirely different experience while organizing:Carol Rogers is the Administrative Assistant at EFWA. She is originally from Western Massachusetts, and was met on a door-to-door membership canvass in 1998 by volunteers with Western Massachusetts Labor Action, a sister effort of EFWA. In 1999 Carol became a full-time volunteer with Western Massachusetts Labor Action. In 2004 she came to Syracuse to work with EFWA. She told her story recounting, "I was met on a canvass, people going door to door and explaining the condition farm workers are living in. I learned that I could donate my time and really help people. They seemed different from other organizations. The cost for joining the organization was $.62 per month. I became a part-time volunteer even though I did not have transportation. A young man came every morning. I got trained. I learned how to type. I learned how to work on a computer. Then they asked me if I wanted to be a full-time volunteer, and I asked what is that? They said 24/7. I said okay because I was bored at home. I knew with this organization I would never be bored. We are always doing something, going places, have speaking engagements, we are always busy."
The balance of benefit to the community and toll on the volunteers, between the assistance they claim to provide and the actual assistance provided to the working poor, and the secrecy surrounding entity finances and operations, continue to make discussions about the NATLFED groups contentious.

See also
List of NATLFED entities
Provisional Communist Party
Gino Perente

References

External links 
 Archive of 1996 anti-NATLFED site: Cached xnatlfed

 Cult Education Institute collection
 FBI file 100-486-889 on NATLFED/EFWA/ESWA/Provisional Communist Party
 ESWAboston.org

 
Political organizations based in the United States
Front organizations